Steven John Renicks (born 28 November 1975) is a Scottish former footballer, who played 'senior' for Hamilton Academical, Stranraer, Queen of the South and Dumbarton.

References

1975 births
Scottish footballers
Dumbarton F.C. players
Hamilton Academical F.C. players
Stranraer F.C. players
Queen of the South F.C. players
Scottish Football League players
Living people
Association football defenders